Agyneta muriensis is a species of sheet weaver found in Nepal. It was described by Wunderlich in 1983.

References

muriensis
Endemic fauna of Nepal
Spiders of Asia
Spiders described in 1983
Arthropods of Nepal